Srinivasacharya Raghavan is an Indian mathematician. He was born on 11 April 1934. He works in number theory.

He was awarded the Shanti Swarup Bhatnagar Prize for Science and Technology in Mathematical Science in 1979 He is also a Fellow of the Indian Academy of Sciences.

He is a coauthor of Homological Methods in Commutative Algebra.

References

Living people
Indian number theorists
20th-century Indian mathematicians
Fellows of the Indian Academy of Sciences
1934 births
Recipients of the Shanti Swarup Bhatnagar Award in Mathematical Science